Challacolloite, KPb2Cl5, is a rare halide mineral. It crystallizes in the monoclinic system (with space group P21/c) and occurs as white fumarolic encrustations on lava. It occurs as intergrowths with cotunnite.

It was first described from a finding at the Challacollo Mine, Iquique, Chile and thereafter identified in specimens from the 1855 Mount Vesuvius eruption and from the Kudryavyi volcano in the Kuriles and also from the Satsuma-Iwojima volcano in Japan. It was recognized as a valid mineral species by the IMA (International Mineralogical Association) in 2005.

Artificially grown KPb2Cl5 crystals are used for lasers.

External links 

Potassium minerals
Lead minerals
Halide minerals
Monoclinic minerals
Minerals in space group 14